"State of Mind" is a protest song by Scottish neo-progressive rock singer Fish, released as his first solo single about a year after his departure from Marillion and preceding the release of his first solo album Vigil in a Wilderness of Mirrors. It is also the first-ever record Fish did outside Marillion except for his 1986 collaboration with Tony Banks on the single "Shortcut to Somewhere" from the Banks album Soundtracks.

Song information
The a-side track is a slow to mid-tempo rock song with strong bass and percussion elements and some Celtic folk elements. Lyrically, the song articulates the general political discontent in the late Thatcher years. In terms of music, lyrics and general mood, it is perhaps closest to the Marillion song "Sugar Mice" (1987). The b-side "The Voyeur (I Like To Watch)" is a harder, although mainly keyboard-based rock song, somewhat similar to Peter Gabriel's "Shock the Monkey"; and "Intruder", the lyrics criticise "TV voyeurism". "The Voyeur" was also included as a bonus track on the CD version of Vigil in a Wilderness of Mirrors. Fish co-wrote both tracks with keyboardist Mickey Simmonds, the dominant musical composer on his debut solo album. Guitarist Hal Lindes has additional credits on "State of Mind". Drums are played by John Keeble, best known for his membership of 1980s pop group Spandau Ballet.

Cover art
The cover was designed by Mark Wilkinson, who had created all of Marillion's artwork until Fish's departure, and has continued to work with Fish since then. The cover shows close-ups of the faces of the couple that also features on the cover of Vigil in a Wilderness of Mirrors with an hourglass between them. The back-cover features an illustration of an atomic explosion inside the hourglass. The single was also the first to feature the circular "Fish" logo designed by Wilkinson, which has been used on all solo releases since then (except for the 1997 album Sunsets on Empire and the singles from it.)

Track listings

7" Single, Cassette Single
State Of Mind (Edited Version) (Dick/Simmonds/Lindes) – 04:12
The Voyeur (I Like to Watch) (Dick/Simmonds) – 04:42

12" Single, 12" Picture Disc
Side 1:
State Of Mind (Presidential mix) (Dick/Simmonds/Lindes) – 05:48
Side 2:
State Of Mind (Edited Version) (Dick/Simmonds/Lindes) – 04:12
The Voyeur (I Like to Watch) (Dick/Simmonds) – 04:42

5" CD Single, 3" CD Single
State Of Mind (Album version) (Dick/Simmonds/Lindes) – 04:45
The Voyeur (I Like to Watch) (Dick/Simmonds) – 04:42
State Of Mind (Presidential mix)(Dick/Simmonds/Lindes) – 05:48
Total Time 15:19

Chart positions
"State of Mind" was the first of five UK top 40 singles by Fish. On 28 October 1989, it entered the UK singles charts at position 32, which would remain its highest position. The following week, it dropped to 36; in the third and final week, it was at 58. In terms of peak chart position, this was Fish's third most successful single.

Personnel
Fish (Derek W. Dick) - Vocals
Frank Usher - Guitars
Hal Lindes - Guitars ("State of Mind" only)
John Giblin - Bass Guitars
Mickey Simmonds - Keyboards
John Keeble - Drums
Luís Jardim - Percussion ("State of Mind" only)
Carol Kenyon - Backing Vocals ("State of Mind" only)

References

External links
Discography entry on Fish's official site

1989 debut singles
1989 songs
EMI Records singles
Protest songs
Political songs
Songs written by Fish (singer)